Darzi Kola (also Romanized as Darzī Kolā; also known as Asb Som-e Deh) is a village in Kheyrud Kenar Rural District, in the Central District of Nowshahr County, Mazandaran Province, Iran. At the 2006 census, its population was 773, in 208 families.

References 

Populated places in Nowshahr County